McKeldin Mall is a nine-acre quad in the heart of the campus of the University of Maryland, College Park. Named after Theodore McKeldin, the former Governor of Maryland, McKeldin Mall is the largest academic mall in the United States. It has been named one of the most picturesque college campus quads in the nation.

Description
McKeldin Mall is book-ended (east to west) by the Main Administration building and McKeldin Library (the main library on campus) and along the north and south borders by various academic buildings, which are the homes to many departments in the College of Behavioral and Social Sciences, College of Arts and Humanities, and the College of Agriculture and Natural Resources. A 16-foot-by-250-foot rectangular fountain features prominently on the eastern half of the mall, honoring the university's members of the Omicron Delta Kappa society. A sundial, honoring Dutch astronomer Uco van Wijk (who founded the university's astronomy program) sits in the center of the mall, at the edge of the ODK fountain. Looking across the mall from the front entrance of McKeldin Library towards the Administration Building sits Testudo, the mascot of the University of Maryland.

The mall underwent a substantial renovation in 1990.

Academic Buildings
Northern end (from east to west):   
Symons Hall
Edward St. John Teaching and Learning Center
H.J. Patterson Hall
Jimenez Hall
                                    
Southern end (from east to west):
Marie Mount Hall
Woods Hall
Francis Scott Key Hall
Tydings Hall
Journalism Building

The Peace Garden

Sitting in between the Main Administration Building and the ODK Fountain on McKeldin Mall is the Peace Garden. The Garden was created to commemorate the victims of the September 11 terrorist attacks. Flowers had been placed along the ODK Fountain on September 12, 2001 as a memorial; the Garden marks the location where those flowers were later buried. A plaque on the site explains the history of the Garden and includes the phrase, "May Peace Prevail on Earth."

Images

References

Notes

External links

 McKeldin Mall webcam
 McKeldin Mall at eBird

University of Maryland, College Park
Parks in Prince George's County, Maryland